Merzbacher is a German surname. Notable people with the surname include:

Eugen Merzbacher (1921–2013), American physicist
Ludwig Merzbacher (1875–1942), German neuroscientist and psychiatrist

See also
Lake Merzbacher, a lake in Kyrgyzstan

German-language surnames